Bromet is a surname, and may refer to:

 Edward Bromet (1867–1937), English rugby union player
 Geoffrey Rhodes Bromet (1891–1983), British Royal Air Force officer
 Laura Bromet (born 1970), Dutch politician
 Mary Bromet, married name of the sculptor Mary Pownall (1862–1937) 
 William Bromet (1868–1949), English rugby union player, brother of Edward Bromet